Rocco Antonio Papaleo (born 16 August 1958) is an Italian actor, film director and singer.

Born in Lauria (Basilicata), he moved to Rome to study math at university but left soon to attend the theatre school. He made his theatrical debut in 1985 acting Sussurri rapidi by Salvatore Di Mattia.

In 1989, he made his first cinema appearance in Senza Pelle, directed by Alessandro D'Alatri and appeared in the television series Classe di ferro.

He is known for his long collaboration with director Leonardo Pieraccioni. He also starred in films like Amalfi: Rewards of the Goddess (2009) by Hiroshi Nishitani and What a Beautiful Day (2010) by Gennaro Nunziante.

He made his debut as a film director in Basilicata coast to coast (2010), winning a Nastro d'Argento and a David di Donatello award for Best New Director. He presented the Sanremo Music Festival 2012, along with Gianni Morandi and Ivana Mrazova

Selected filmography
 Dark Illness (1989)
 The Graduates (1995)
 August Vacation (1995)
 The Barber of Rio (1996)
 Viola Kisses Everybody (1998)
 Volesse il cielo! (2002)
 Suddenly Paradise (2003)
 Il pranzo della domenica (2003)
 I Love You in Every Language in the World (2005)
 Commediasexi (2006)
 A Beautiful Wife (2007)
 Cado dalle nubi (2009)
 Me and Marilyn (2009)
 Amalfi: Rewards of the Goddess (2009)
 Basilicata Coast to Coast (2010)
 What a Beautiful Day (2011)
 Finalmente la felicità (2011)
 Escort in Love (2011)
 È nata una star? (2012)
 Una piccola impresa meridionale (2013)
 A Boss In The Living Room (2014)
 Happily Mixed Up (2014)
 La scuola più bella del mondo (2014)
 An Italian Name (2015)
 Onda su onda (2016)
 The Place (2017)
 Bob & Marys - Criminali a domicilio (2018)
 The King's Musketeers (2018)
Si vive una volta sola (2021)

Television
 Classe di ferro (1989–1991)
 Quelli della speciale (1992)
 Padre Pio: Between Heaven and Earth (2000)
 Vola Sciusciù (2000)
 Giornalisti (2000)
 Cuore contro cuore (2004)
 Le Cri (2006)
 Sanremo Music Festival (2012)

Discography 
Che non si sappia in giro (BMG Ricordi, 1997)
La mia parte imperfetta (Sony Music, 2012)

Notes

External links

Italian male film actors
People from Lauria
1958 births
Living people
Italian film directors
Italian male singers
Nastro d'Argento winners